Nick Beaulieu (born August 19, 1968 in Rimouski, Quebec) is a retired Canadian ice hockey left winger.

Beaulieu played 143 games (regular season and playoff) in the International Hockey League (1945–2001) and 60 regular season games in the American Hockey League.  In addition, Beaulieu played for the Tulsa Oilers in the inaugural season of the Central Hockey League (1992–2014) and the Green Bay Ice in the only season of the American Hockey Association (1992–93).

Beaulieu was drafted in the 8th round, 168th pick overall, in the 1986 NHL Entry Draft by the Edmonton Oilers.

Beaulieu was signed by the Los Angeles Kings organization, but never played in the National Hockey League.

References

External links

1968 births
Living people
Canadian expatriate ice hockey players in the United States
Canadian ice hockey left wingers
Edmonton Oilers draft picks
Ice hockey people from Quebec
People from Rimouski
Tulsa Oilers (1992–present) players